FC Energie Cottbus (Lower Sorbian: Energija Chóśebuz) is a German football club based in Cottbus, Brandenburg. It was founded in 1963 as SC Cottbus in what was East Germany. After the reunification of Germany, Energie played six seasons in the third tier of the German football league system before floating between the 2. Bundesliga and Bundesliga for 17 years between 1997 and 2014. From 2014 to 2016, the club played in the third tier, 3. Liga, and were then relegated to the Regionalliga Nordost. In 2018, they were promoted back into the 3. Liga, only to be relegated again the next season.

History

Predecessor sides
Energie Cottbus can trace its roots back to a predecessor side of FSV Glückauf Brieske-Senftenberg, a club founded by coal miners in 1919, in what was then called the town of Marga. FV Grube Marga, as the club was then called, was active until 1924 when the miners left to form a new team called SV Sturm Grube Marga which was banned by the Nazi Party in 1933.

East German era

The club re-emerged after World War II in 1949 as BSG Franz Mehring Grube, becoming BSG Aktivist Brieske-Ost in 1950. The club was re-organized as sports club SC Aktivist Brieske-Senftenberg in 1954 and played in the DDR-Oberliga generally earning mid-table results until relegation to second-tier DDR-Liga in the early 1960s. The players of this side joined the new sports club SC Energie Cottbus in 1963, whilst the reserve team merged back to BSG Aktivist Brieske-Ost to form BSG Aktivist Senftenberg. The club still exists as FSV Glückauf Brieske-Senftenberg today. SC Cottbus was quickly assisted by a wholesale transfer of players from SC Aktivist Brieske-Ost ordered by the East German authorities, who often intervened in the business of the country's sports and football clubs for political reasons. East German authorities had a penchant for tagging sports teams with the names of socialist heroes: Franz Mehring was a German socialist politician and journalist.

In the mid-1960s, a re-organization program by the regime led to the separation of football sides from sports clubs and the creation of BSG von Bodo Krautz under the patronage of a local coal mine. The football club went by that name only briefly and was quickly renamed BSG Energie in early 1966.

German reunification

The team took on the name FC Energie in 1990 at the time of German reunification.

After years as a II division or lower-table I division side in East Germany, Energie emerged as one of the few former DDR sides to enjoy relative prosperity in a united Germany. After six seasons playing tier III football, the club earned returned to the 2. Bundesliga in 1997 (the same year they became the first former East German club to play the DFB Cup Final), winning the Regionalliga Nordost, and then played its way into the Bundesliga in 2000, where it managed a three-year stay. A key player in the Bundesliga run was Vasile Miriuță, an imaginative midfield player. After being Promotion and relegation#relegatedreturned, Energie narrowly missed a prompt return to the top tier, losing out to Mainz 05 on goal difference.

In 2004–05, Energie struggled with both financial (reported debts of €4.5 million) and on-field problems, and the only club escaped relegation to the third tier Regionalliga by scoring one more goal than Eintracht Trier while having the same number of points and goal difference. During the season, the manager and the chairman were replaced. The 2005–06 season was a much more successful one, as the club finished third and returned to Bundesliga.

The 2006–07 Bundesliga season resulted in a 13th-place finish and 41 points, a club record total in the Bundesliga. Energie Cottbus were the only club from the former East Germany playing in the Bundesliga until they lost a relegation play-off to 1. FC Nürnberg in 2009. Cottbus remained in the 2. Bundesliga for another five seasons until 2014, when an 18th-place finish meant returning to the 3. Liga, ending a 17-season stint in the top two divisions. After a 19th-place finish in the 3. Liga in 2015–16, the club suffered another returned to the Regionalliga Nordost.

Following two seasons in the fourth tier, Cottbus returned to 3. Liga after defeating Weiche Flensburg over two legs in the Regionalliga play-offs, but in the 2018–19 season they were returned to the Regionalliga after finishing 17th.

The German Chancellor Angela Merkel is an honorary member of the club.

Honours
The club's honours:
 DFB-Pokal:
 Runners-up: 1997
 2. Bundesliga (II)
 Bundesliga promotion: 2000, 2006
 DDR-Liga Staffeln A (II)
 Winners: 1988
 Runners-up: 1986
 DDR-Liga Staffeln B (II)
 Runners-up: 1973
 DDR-Liga Staffeln D (II)
 Winners: 1975, 1980, 1981
 Runners-up: 1978
 DDR-Liga Staffeln Nord (II)
 Runners-up: 1965, 1968
 Regionalliga Nordost: (III/IV)
 Winners: 1997, 2018
 German Under 17 championship:
 Runners-up: 2004
 Brandenburg Cup (Tiers III-VII)
 Winners: 1995, 1996, 1997, 1998‡, 2001‡, 2015, 2017, 2018, 2019, 2022
 DFB-Pokal U17
 Winners: 2011

Team

Current squad

Notable players

Statistics

The all-foreign line-up
On 6 April 2001, Energie became the first Bundesliga club to field a side made up of 11 foreign players. Energie often fielded nine or ten foreigners that season: German players appeared a total of just 83 times, with striker Sebastian Helbig as the leader with 28.

The players were Tomislav Piplica, Faruk Hujdurović, Bruno Akrapović (Bosnia and Herzegovina), János Mátyus, Vasile Miriuță (Hungary), Rudi Vata (Albania), Moussa Latoundji (Benin), Andrzej Kobylański (Poland), Antun Labak (Croatia), Laurențiu Reghecampf (Romania), and Franklin (Brazil). As a side note, even the three substitutes were foreigners, namely Johnny Rödlund from Sweden, Sabin Ilie from Romania and Witold Wawrzyczek from Poland .

Reserve team
The club's reserve team, FC Energie Cottbus II, has played as high as Regionalliga level, last playing in the Regionalliga Nordost in 2012–13. The team most recently played in the tier five NOFV-Oberliga Süd but has, in the past, also played in the northern division of the league. It first reached Oberliga level in 1998 and has won league championships in 2007 and 2010. At the end of the 2015–16 season, the team was withdrawn from competition.

In 1998, it also won the Brandenburgischer Landespokal, the local cup competition in Brandenburg, and qualified for the first round of the DFB-Pokal through this. In 1998–99, it went out losing 1–0 to SpVgg Greuther Fürth, in 2001–02 it lost 4–0 to Arminia Bielefeld.

References

External links

The Abseits Guide to German Soccer

 
Football clubs in Germany
Football clubs in East Germany
Football clubs in Brandenburg
Sport in Cottbus
Association football clubs established in 1966
Mining association football clubs in Germany
1966 establishments in East Germany
Bundesliga clubs
2. Bundesliga clubs
3. Liga clubs